"When We Were Young" is the second and final single by British pop group Take That from the band's first EP, Progressed.   It acted as the theme song in the feature film adaptation of The Three Musketeers, which premiered in the United Kingdom on 14 October 2011. The song is the last to feature Jason Orange and Robbie Williams and features Williams and Gary Barlow on lead vocals. The single was released to radio on 11 July 2011 and was released in the United Kingdom as a digital download on 22 August 2011.

Background
On 7 July 2011, it was announced on Take That's official website that "When We Were Young" would be the next single from Progressed, and that it would also serve as the theme song for the new film adaptation of The Three Musketeers, directed by Paul W. S. Anderson. Gary Barlow stated that the song was written after Take That watched a private screening of the film. Barlow stated "The film is visually so rich and beautiful that our main challenge was to then match it musically. We've returned to guitars, real pianos and a conventional song structure to achieve this. We also thought that the Musketeers reminded us of ourselves."

Critical reception
In his review of Take That's Progressed, Gavin Martin of The Daily Mirror concluded that "the trad Barlow ballad setting of 'When We Were Young' ... extends the original album's balancing act between dignified nostalgia and commercially crafted experimentation." Music News Daily gave the song a positive review stating that it "is a song best listened to when in a reflective mood.  Williams takes lead vocals duty once more, with Barlow again on 2nd lead. It’s a beautifully crafted song, which is bound to evoke bitter-sweet memories for listeners and it deserves to be a huge hit." 
Heat praised the song by stating that "When We Were Young kicks the album off in a mid-tempo way, with a very catchy intro. It comes with a big chorus and is a bubbling mix of TT old and new."

Music video
The official music video was released on 14 July 2011. The video was shot in color and color-corrected to a uniform cold blue tint. It features Take That performing the song inside an empty Wembley Stadium after one of their Progress Live concerts, with each member in a different location of the ground. Robbie Williams opens the video on the b stage, surrounded by ticker tape, trying to grab it as the wind blows through the stadium. Gary Barlow is shown to be sitting in the seats looking down upon the stage as he performs the chorus, whilst Mark Owen, Jason Orange and Howard Donald all look around the stadium contemplating the night before. At the end of the video, they all join together and perform in front of the stage prop of their tour and as the final chorus is sung they join hands and bow to their audience.
The video itself was praised by critics for its approach and its sentimental value.
The video is the last to feature Jason Orange and Robbie Williams.

Chart performance
The song debuted at number eighty-eight on the UK Singles Chart the week it was released, as an album track download from Progressed without promotion or a physical release.

Personnel
Gary Barlow – co-lead vocals
Robbie Williams – co-lead vocals, backing vocals
Howard Donald – backing vocals
Jason Orange – backing vocals
Mark Owen – backing vocals

Track listing
Digital download
 "When We Were Young" (album version) – 4:34

UK promo single
 "When We Were Young" (single version) – 4:06
 "When We Were Young" (single instrumental) – 4:05

UK iTunes package
 "When We Were Young" – 4:34
 "When We Were Young" (music video) – 4:51

Charts

Release history

References

2011 singles
Take That songs
Songs written by Gary Barlow
Songs written by Mark Owen
Songs written by Jason Orange
Songs written by Howard Donald
Songs written by Robbie Williams
Song recordings produced by Stuart Price
Rock ballads